The Borough of Sebastopol was a local government area about  south of the regional city of Ballarat, Victoria, Australia.

Sebastopol was incorporated as a borough on 1 October 1864. On 6 May 1994, the Borough of Sebastopol was abolished, and along with the City of Ballaarat, the Shire of Ballarat, and parts of the Shires of Bungaree, Buninyong, Grenville and Ripon, was merged into the newly created City of Ballarat.

Population

* Estimate in the 1958 Victorian Year Book.

References

External links
 Victorian Places - Sebastopol

Sebastopol Borough